The Dassault AVE-C Moyen Duc was a sub-scale experimental stealth UAV built in France in 2004 as a step in the development of a UCAV under Dassault Aviation's LOGIDUC programme. AVE-C stands for Aéronef de Validation Expérimentale - Contrôle ("Experimental Assessment Aircraft - Control"), and Moyen Duc is the French name for the long-eared owl, but also a wordplay on the LOGIDUC programme name, with moyen meaning "middle". As the AVE-D was designed by Dassault according to a rapid prototyping to cost methodology, the AVE-C was developed and completed within a year and the first prototype was produced in July 2001.

The AVE-C is a stealth tactical UAV prototype developed according to the French Army's post-SDTI needs in reconnaissance. In 2002, Dassault planned to create an industrial partnership with French electronic company Sagem. The company was founded the following year as Dassault-Sagem Tactical UAV with the purpose to mass-produce the Moyen Duc. The 2004 tactical UAV Dassault-Sagem SlowFast is based on the Moyen Duc, with the Sagem Sperwer's ground control station, and will be used by the French Army.

Specifications

References

2000s French experimental aircraft
Unmanned aerial vehicles of France
Unmanned stealth aircraft
AVE-C Moyen Duc